On the Wings of an Eagle is an album by pianist John Hicks, recorded in 2006.

Background
The album was recorded by the working trio led by pianist John Hicks, with bassist Buster Williams, and drummer Louis Hayes.

Recording and music
The album was recorded at St. Peter's Episcopal Church, New York City, on March 10, 2006. Hicks wrote "As Birds Fly (Walton's Mountain)" as a tribute to pianist Cedar Walton; "Strivers Jewels" and "Christina" were composed by Williams.

Release
On the Wings of an Eagle was released by Chesky Records.

Reception

The Penguin Guide to Jazz commented that "Hicks died eight weeks after the recording, which lends it a certain poignancy, but even without that association it would be a cracking set."

Track listing
"Minority"
"Fly Little Bird Fly"
"Strivers Jewels"
"Balues-Bolivar-Balues-Are"
"Cheese Cake"
"Dedicated to You"
"Minor Mishap"
"Christina"
"As Birds Fly (Walton's Mountain)"

Personnel
John Hicks – piano
Buster Williams – bass
Louis Hayes – drums

References

John Hicks (jazz pianist) albums
2006 albums
Chesky Records albums